Glyncaled is a hamlet in the  community of Llandyfriog, Ceredigion, Wales, which is 64.8 miles (104.3 km) from Cardiff and 185.8 miles (299 km) from London. Glyncaled is represented in the Senedd by Elin Jones (Plaid Cymru) and is part of the Ceredigion constituency in the House of Commons.

References

See also
List of localities in Wales by population 

Villages in Ceredigion